Heidi Metzger is a German former professional racing cyclist. She won the German National Road Race Championship in 1990 and 1991.

References

External links
 

Year of birth missing (living people)
Living people
German female cyclists
Place of birth missing (living people)